The Herrick Corporation is a steel corporation headquartered in Stockton, California, USA. The company has additional factories in San Bernardino, Texas, Mississippi, and Thailand.

History
The Herrick Corporation was founded in 1921. The steel sold by the corporation was used to build many skyscrapers in Los Angeles and San Francisco. 

As of 2011, the company had a workforce of 2,000. Its Chairman is David H. Dornsife.

References

Companies based in Stockton, California
Manufacturing companies established in 1921
Steel companies of the United States
1921 establishments in California